Marion Township is a township in Bourbon County, Kansas, USA.  As of the 2000 census, its population was 1,165.

Geography
According to the USGS, it contains five cemeteries: Hatch, Marion, Mount Zion, Turkey Creek and Walnut Hill.

The streams of Dyer Creek, Hinton Creek, Turkey Creek, Walnut Creek, West Fork Dry Wood Creek and Wolfpen Creek run through this township.

Further reading

References

 USGS Geographic Names Information System (GNIS)

External links
 City-Data.com
 Bourbon County Maps: Current, Historic Collection

Townships in Bourbon County, Kansas
Townships in Kansas